Sandra Zaniewska (born 3 January 1992) is a Polish tennis coach and former professional player.

In her career, she won ten singles tournaments as well as a further seven in doubles on the ITF Circuit, and was the runner-up of the 2009 Australian Open in girls' doubles, with partner Aleksandra Krunić.

Zaniewska is currently the coach of French professional  Alizé Cornet.

Personal life
Sandra Zaniewska was born to Maciej Zaniewski and Teresa Zaniewska on 3 January 1992 in Katowice. She has one brother, Bartek. Sandra began playing tennis at age ten.

ITF finals

Singles: 20 (10–10)

Doubles: 22 (7–15)

Junior Grand Slam finals

Girls' doubles

References

External links
 
 

1992 births
Living people
Sportspeople from Katowice
Polish female tennis players
21st-century Polish women